Joseph Denis Patrick Labrecque (born March 6, 1971) is a Canadian ice hockey coach and former player. Labrecque played two games  (0–1, 4.29 GAA) for the Montreal Canadiens in the 1995–96 NHL season, as well as for many other teams across North America and Europe.

Lebrecque was born in LaSalle, Quebec. He was drafted in the 1991 NHL Entry Draft by the Quebec Nordiques. He wore jersey number 31 for the Canadiens. During the 2001–02 QMJHL season, he was a goaltender coach for the Cape Breton Screaming Eagles.

External links

1971 births
Living people
Canadian ice hockey goaltenders
Cornwall Aces players
Fredericton Canadiens players
French Quebecers
Halifax Citadels players
Hershey Bears players
Ice hockey people from Montreal
Saint-Jean Castors players
Saint-Jean Lynx players
Montreal Canadiens players
People from LaSalle, Quebec
Quebec Nordiques draft picks
Quebec Rafales players